The Tajikistan women's national handball team represents Tajikistan in international handball competitions and is controlled by Tajikistan Handball Association.

The Team is yet to compete in any major tournaments at senior level. However the team plays friendly matches and competes at Asian tournaments at junior level.

Tournament records

Asian Championship
 Yet to participate.

Asian Games
 Yet to participate.

Other Tournaments

References

External links
Official Facebook
IHF profile

National team
Women's national handball teams
Handball
Handball in Tajikistan